Germantown High School was a secondary school located in Philadelphia, Pennsylvania. Germantown High School graduated its final class on June 19, 2013 and closed its doors that week.

GHS, located in Germantown, was a part of the School District of Philadelphia.
The school was built in 1914. Its students were mostly African-American, despite the previous German population of the region. Students came from the Logan, Germantown, Mt. Airy, Chestnut Hill, and Nicetown-Tioga sections of the city.

The team name was the Bears.1993-94 and 95 Men's Varsity basketball was ranked top in the city of Philadelphia.

History

Germantown High became a grade 11-12 school after Martin Luther King High School, housing grades 9-10, opened on February 8, 1972. The school district used this arrangement since it intended to keep students in Northwest Philadelphia economically integrated. Some neighborhoods in proximity to King, such as East Mount Airy and West Oak Lane, wanted King to become a 9-12 school because Germantown High was located in proximity to poorer areas. Eventually Germantown and King became separate 9-12 schools.

Germantown High's peak student population was over 3,000. The enrollment declined due to the availability of magnet schools and charter schools. Prior to the school's 2013 closure, an entire wing had been blocked off and there were 676 students. In 2013 the students from Germantown were transferred to King.

In April 2019, the Germantown United CDC and the Keeping Society of Philadelphia filed a nomination authored by Oscar Beisert, Architectural Historian and Historic Preservationist, to list the building in the Philadelphia Register of Historic Places. At its 691st Stated Meeting on March 13, 2020, the Philadelphia Historical Commission voted unanimously to designate the building and its grounds, a status which comes with protection from alteration and demolition, as well as regulatory authority during any future redevelopment of the property.

Demographics
In 2013 the school had 676 students, mostly low income and African-American. Students in foster care and homeless students made up at least 10% of that student body.

Academic performance
In 2013 the school's graduation rate was below 50%, 18% of students had proficiency in reading, and 15% had proficiency in mathematics.

Athletics
American football players had to ride a bus to sports practice because Germantown High did not have an on-campus athletic field. King and Germantown were previously athletic rivals, but after 2013 American football team players of Germantown High joined King's team.

Feeder patterns
Feeder middle schools into Germantown included Roosevelt Middle School. K-8 feeder schools into Germantown included Charles W. Henry School, Henry H. Houston School, John S. Jenks School, and Anna L. Lingelbach School. Students zoned to Henry, Houston, Jenks, and Lingelbach are now zoned to Roxborough High School. Students zoned to Roosevelt are now zoned to King High School.

Alumni
Belinda C. Anderson (born 1954), academic administrator
Frankie Beverly, singer
Steve Coleman, football player
William Thaddeus Coleman Jr., 4th US Secretary of Transportation, and 2nd African American to serve in the US Cabinet.
Bill Cosby, comedian, actor
Bill Fleischman, sports journalist and professor
Sam Greenblatt, CTO of HP, Dell
Rick Lackman, football player
 Randy Owens (1959-2015), basketball player
Will Parks, NFL player, Miami Dolphins
Victor Potamkin, businessman and car dealership owner 
Frank K. Richardson, judge
Mark Segal, journalist
Archie Shepp, jazz saxophonist
The Showstoppers
Mike Sojourner, basketball player, 10th overall pick of 1974 NBA draft
Tammi Terrell, singer
Herman Frazier, Olympic Gold and Silver Medalist 1976
Linda Addison, maiden name Webster, multi-award winning author/poet 1970

References

External links

 - 2007-2016
 - 2001-2007

School District of Philadelphia
High schools in Philadelphia
Public high schools in Pennsylvania
Educational institutions established in 1914
1914 establishments in Pennsylvania
Educational institutions disestablished in 2013
Germantown, Philadelphia
2013 disestablishments in Pennsylvania